is a manga short series written by Osamu Tezuka. It was originally serialized in Kobunsha's  magazine from 1951 to 1952. The series is mostly noted for introducing the world-famous character Astro Boy. The series would be released as Chapter 0 in the original Astro Boy   tankōbon  volumes published by Kodansha.

References

Short story series
Osamu Tezuka manga